Abu Omar may refer to:

People
Abu Abdullah al-Rashid al-Baghdadi (died 2010), also known as Abu Omar al-Baghdadi, Iraqi insurgent
Abu Qatada al-Filistini (born 1959), sometimes called Abu Omar, Jordanian militant living in England
Ahmed Ali Ahmed, also known as Abu Omar, former leader of al-Qaeda in Iraq
Hassan Mustafa Osama Nasr (born 1963), also known as Abu Omar, Egyptian cleric kidnapped in Milan by the CIA in 2003
Abu Hassan Omar (1940–2018), Malaysian politician
Abu Hafs Umar al-Iqritishi (died 855), Muslim pirate
Abu Hafs Umar al-Nasafi (1067–1142), Muslim jurist and theologian
Abu Hafs Umar al-Murtada (died 1266), Almohad caliph
Mahdi Abu-Omar (born 1970), American chemist
Mohammed Mohiedin Anis (born 1946/7), Syrian car collector, also known as Abu Omar

Places 
Abu Omar, Idlib, a Syrian village located in Al-Tamanah Nahiyah in Maarrat al-Nu'man District, Idlib